Luis Johnson (born 20 February 1999) is a professional rugby league footballer who plays as a  forward for Hull Kingston Rovers in the Betfred Super League. 

He has previously played for the Warrington Wolves in the Super League, and spent time on loan from Warrington at the Rochdale Hornets and the Widnes Vikings in the Championship, and Hull KR in the Super League.

Background
Johnson was born in Leeds, West Yorkshire, England and is of English and Jamaican descent.

He started his amateur career at Oulton Raiders in Leeds at 4 years of age and was selected by the Castleford Tigers at 15 years old to join their scholarship programme. He went on to their academy programme but 2018 Warrington Wolves bought him out of his contract for £45,000 and Johnson signed a 3 year deal to join the club.

Career

Warrington Wolves
In 2018 he made his Super League début for the Wolves against the Wigan Warriors.

Johnson spent the majority of his time out on loan at the Rochdale Hornets, Widnes Vikings and latterly HKR.

Hull Kingston Rovers
It was announced on 10 December 2020 that Johnson would join HKR on a permanent basis when a two-year swap deal was agreed with Robbie Mulhern joining Warrington Wolves.

Johnson played for Hull KR in their 28-10 semi-final loss against the Catalans Dragons as they fell one game short of the grand final.

References

External links
Warrington Wolves profile
SL profile

1999 births
Living people
Dewsbury Rams players
English people of Jamaican descent
English rugby league players
Hull Kingston Rovers players
Rochdale Hornets players
Rugby league second-rows
Rugby league players from Leeds
Warrington Wolves players
Widnes Vikings players